Jennifer Rardin (April 28, 1965 – September 20, 2010) was an American urban fantasy author, known for writing the Jaz Parks series.

Background
She was born in Evansville, Indiana on April 28, 1965, to James and Carol Pringle and started writing at age 12. She graduated from Casey-Westfield high school and in 1987, received a bachelor's degree in English literature from Eastern Illinois University. She married Kirk Rardin in 1986 and wrote three unpublished fantasy novels before starting the Jaz Parks series. Rardin died on September 20, 2010. Earlier that year, before her death, Rardin had announced that she would be working on a new book entitled Book Club Of The Damned.

Her writing influences include Laurell K. Hamilton,

Bibliography

Jaz Parks series
Once Bitten, Twice Shy (2007) 
Another One Bites the Dust (2007)   
Biting the Bullet (2008)  
Bitten to Death (2008) 
One More Bite (2009)
Bite Marks (2009)
Bitten in Two (2010)
The Deadliest Bite (2011)

Jaz Park novellas
Scouting Jasmine (2011)
The Golem Hunt (2011)
An Evening for Vayl and Jaz (2011)

Other short stories
The Minion Chronicles: Paul and Brady Get Hoodoo with the Voodoo (2011)
Zombie Jamboree (2011)

References

External links

Fantasy Literature profile

Writers from Evansville, Indiana
People from Crawford County, Illinois
21st-century American novelists
American women novelists
Novelists from Illinois
1965 births
2010 deaths
Women science fiction and fantasy writers
Urban fantasy writers
American fantasy writers
21st-century American women writers
20th-century American novelists
20th-century American women writers
Novelists from Indiana